Foxear Lake is a lake in the municipality of Greenstone, Thunder Bay District in northwestern Ontario, Canada. It is in the Great Lakes Basin, lies in the geographic township of Walters, and is the source of Foxear Creek.

The main inflow is an unnamed creek at the northwest. The major outflow, at the west, is Foxear Creek, which flows via the Namewaminikan River, Lake Nipigon and the Nipigon River to Lake Superior.

Ontario Highway 801 passes  to the west.

References

Other map sources:

Lakes of Thunder Bay District